"Mother's Day" is the 287th episode of NBC's legal drama Law & Order and the tenth episode of the thirteenth season. The 45 minute episode was filmed in New York City.

Summary 
A mother kills her own son, who has schizophrenia and issues with his medication. She kills him as she feels compelled to stop him from killing anyone else.

Setting 
The episode is set in Washington Heights. Contextually, Washington Heights is considered an area with a low socioeconomic level in America. The demographics consist of immigrants; making up 48% of the population as of June 2015. Although, there has been a 'steep reduction in crime' it is still an issue of 'concern.' Rent is low in the area relative to the rest of Manhattan. Despite this affordability is an issue due to the relatively low household income level. Furthermore, according to the U.S. Census Bureau, the unemployment rate for the area is 4% higher than the citywide range.

Plot 

Briscoe and Green are called to the scene of a hit-and-run accident in Washington Heights. When arriving at the scene; the victim is identified as high school student Emily Milius. From the tire marks on the road, the detectives suspect Ms. Milius was deliberately run down.

The Miliuses are a wealthy family and when Briscoe says Emily Milius may have been deliberately targeted, the victim's father Ronald Milius reveals he is CFO of a Fortune 500 pharmaceutical company and a witness in an FBI fraud investigation into the company's directors. He thinks his daughter was killed as threat to him.

A suspect green Saturn is discovered and forensic evidence proves the car struck Emily Milius. The car is registered to single mother Diane Payton, who tells Briscoe and Green she lent her car to her son Danny a few days earlier. The detectives are forced to break into Danny Payton's apartment where they discover his body. He has been stabbed to death.

At this stage, the detectives think Danny Payton was hired to kill Emily Milius. The detectives speculate he took the job to support a suggested drug habit, and then killed himself, as directed by the hirer. But the medical examiner, Dr. Rodgers, reports no drugs in Danny Payton's system.

When Green and Dr. Rodgers establish Danny's likely time of death, the detectives realize Diane Payton lied to them about the morning after the victim's death. Diane Payton is brought down to the 27th precinct, the police station for the detectives featured on Law & Order,  for further questioning. Briscoe and Van Buren play good cop / bad cop with Mrs. Payton. Briscoe aggressively questions her. Van Buren timely enters the room and admonishes Briscoe for his rudeness, before inviting Mrs. Payton for a coffee and a private chat. Van Buren empathizes with Mrs. Payton over the difficulties of being a mother ("You're only as happy as your unhappiest kid"). Eventually, Diane Payton admits she stabbed her own son to death. She is arrested, and later arraigned to the court and enters a plea of not guilty.
 
Mrs. Payton's attorney, Kay Hartley, approaches Southerlyn and identifies herself as an old college friend. Later, in a discussion with McCoy, Southerlyn reveals she remembers Hartley as a highly competitive student set upon becoming a high-earning Wall Street lawyer. Hartley says her firm has asked her to take on Mrs. Payton's case pro bono. McCoy is surprised a tax lawyer would be asked to try a criminal case.

Later, Southerlyn is approached by Hartley while exercising in Central Park. Hartley reveals Danny Payton was her cousin and Diane Payton is her aunt. Hartley has taken a leave of absence from her firm to defend her aunt. Danny Payton had schizophrenia and Hartley wants to introduce his medical records into evidence, but Diane Payton refuses to allow this. Hartley wants to make a motion to enable this new evidence to come to life. Partially through sympathy, the DAs agree not to oppose the motion, which is granted.

In the trial, psychiatrist Dr. Trask testifies Danny Payton was diagnosed with schizophrenia several years earlier and was held in a psychiatric hospital, but was eventually released, as medication proved effective in controlling his condition. He confirms Mrs. Payton recently requested her son be re-admitted to the hospital as his condition had worsened. However, Dr Trask refused his readmission once he established Danny had stopped taking his medications. When Diane Payton takes the stand to be questioned by Hartley, she admits her son had stopped taking his medication as it made him feel extremely depressed and nauseous. Subsequently, he began hearing voices urging him to kill. Following the refusal of the hospital to take Danny in, Mrs. Payton lent Danny her car ("long drives calmed him down.") It was on this drive he hit Emily Milius. This was the final straw. Diane Payton felt compelled to murder her son to prevent him from killing more people.

McCoy demands a hearing in chambers. He is outraged the defense is effectively changing their plea from not guilty to guilty by justification. He demands the defense case be thrown out, but the judge refuses. McCoy's position begins to look weak. Southerlyn confronts Hartley, angry that Hartley played on her sympathy to get the medical records introduced. She accuses Hartley of being less motivated by love for her family and more by the boost it would provide to her career.

The next day McCoy cross-examines Diane Payton and asks why she didn't inform the police of her son's suspected actions, or call the police herself after she killed him. Finally, McCoy asks that if Diane Payton knew her son was a homicidal man with schizophrenia, why did she willingly give him the keys to her car?

The jury finds Diane Payton guilty of second-degree murder, but the jury foreperson asks if any jail time is necessary.

Themes 

 Mother and child relationship
 Self-interest being a motive before the welfare of others at all cost

Guest stars 

 Charissa Chamorro as Kay Hartley
 Ellen McLaughlin as Diane Payton
 Janet Zarish as Caroline Milius
 Martin Kildare as Ronald Milius
 Leslie Hendrix as Dr. Elizabeth Rodgers
 Mark Alan Gordon as Dr. David Trask
 Don Billett as Judge Ed Richter

References

External links 
 "Law and Order" Mother's Day at imdb.com

Law & Order episodes
2003 American television episodes
Washington Heights, Manhattan
Mother's Day